Mikhail Vladimirovich Alpatov (10 December 1902, Moscow - 9 May 1986, Moscow) was a Soviet historian and art theorist, notable for his contribution to the history of the culture of ancient Rus.

Biography
Alpatov graduated from Moscow State University, where he studied the history of arts from 1919 and 1921. Subsequently, he worked at the Museum of Fine Arts in Moscow, and, from 1923 to 1930, in the Institute of Archeology and Art History of the Academy of Sciences. In 1943 he became a professor at the Surikov State Institute of Arts, also in Moscow. In 1954, he became a member of the USSR Academy of Art. He died in 1986.

Work
Beginning in the 1920s, Alpatov was primarily engaged in researching the culture and art of the Byzantine Empire and of ancient Rus. Later, he also turned to the Renaissance, and to the general theory of culture. He advocated that art history is a reflection of history itself, a kind of "applied history". He discovered deep connections between old Russian art, in particular, Andrei Rublev, and Byzantine and Greek art.

References

1902 births
1986 deaths
20th-century Russian historians
20th-century Russian male writers
Writers from Moscow
Full Members of the USSR Academy of Arts
Members of the Austrian Academy of Sciences
Moscow State University alumni
Recipients of the Order of Lenin
Recipients of the Order of the Red Banner of Labour
Recipients of the USSR State Prize
Russian art historians
Russian educators
Russian male writers
Soviet art historians
Soviet educators
Soviet male writers
Burials at Vagankovo Cemetery